Las Colegialas may refer to:

Las Colegialas (1946), Mexican film
Las Colegialas (1986), Argentine film